The Benefit of Clergy Act 1402 (4 Hen. 4 c.3) was an Act passed during the reign of Henry IV of England by the Parliament of England. It abolished compurgation for high treason and theft.

See also
Benefit of clergy
High treason in the United Kingdom

References

Treason in England
Acts of the Parliament of England
15th century in England
1402 in England
1400s in law
English criminal law